Rumen Shankulov (born 22 August 1976) is a former Bulgarian footballer who played as a forward.

References

External links 
 

1976 births
Living people
Bulgarian footballers
PFC Spartak Pleven players
PFC Litex Lovech players
PFC Vidima-Rakovski Sevlievo players
PFC Marek Dupnitsa players
PFC Cherno More Varna players
Neftochimic Burgas players
Omonia Aradippou players
FC Dunav Ruse players
First Professional Football League (Bulgaria) players
Second Professional Football League (Bulgaria) players
Cypriot Second Division players
Bulgarian expatriate footballers
Expatriate footballers in Cyprus
Association football forwards